Porri is a surname. Notable people with the name include:

 Michel Ferracci-Porri (born 1949), French author
 Daniello Porri (died 1566), Italian painter

See also
 Porri
 Porro (surname)

Italian-language surnames